Lieutenant General John Arnold Heintges (9 December 191231 March 1994) was a United States Army officer who served in World War II, the Laotian Civil War, and the Vietnam War.

Early life
Heintges was born on 9 December 1912 in Koblenz, German Empire. His father was an officer in the Imperial German Army who was killed in action in the Battle of Tannenberg. In 1920 his family emigrated to the United States, sponsored by an uncle who was a major in the Army Medical Corps, and his mother remarried an infantry officer.

Military career
Heintges attended the United States Military Academy and was commissioned as a Second Lieutenant in 1936. He served in the 45th Infantry Regiment Philippine Scouts from 1937 to 1939. He then served as a company commander and regimental Operations Officer (S3) of the 13th Infantry Regiment, 8th Infantry Division at Fort Jackson, South Carolina from 1940 to 1942.

During World War II, Heintges commanded the 3rd Battalion, 7th Infantry Regiment, 3rd Infantry Division and then commanded the 7th Regiment. He saw action in Sicily, Italy, southern France and Germany and his regiment captured Adolf Hitler’s Berghof in Berchtesgaden on 4 May 1945. Heintges took Hermann Göring's 1941 Mercedes-Benz 540K Cabriolet B for his personal use during the occupation.

Following graduation from the United States Army War College, Heintges served in the Army Operations (G3) section. In 1954 he was posted to West Germany as Chief, Army Section, U.S. Military Assistance Group, Germany where he prepared and implemented the training plan for the West German Army. From 1957 to 1958 he served as deputy commander of the Army Infantry Training Center at Fort Dix.

In 1958, Heintges was appointed as commander of Programs Evaluation Office (PEO) in Laos. In order to assume this new role he nominally resigned from the Army and served in Laos as a civilian. During this time he developed the Heintges Plan to improve US assistance to the Royal Lao Army.

From 1961 to 1962, Heintges served as Director of Organization and Training, Office of the Deputy of Chief of Staff for Military Operations in Washington D.C. He served as commander of the 5th Infantry Division (Mechanized) in Fort Carson, Colorado from 29 January 1963 to 15 July 1964. He served as commander of Fort Benning from August 1964 to July 1965.

Heintges was promoted to Lieutenant General and was assigned as Commanding General, I Corps in South Korea from 1 August to 5 November 1965. In November 1965 he was appointed as Deputy Commander, Military Assistance Command, Vietnam (MACV). In May 1967 he was succeeded in that role by General Creighton Abrams.

Heintges then served as deputy commander, Seventh United States Army.  He subsequently served as Deputy Commander in Chief United States Army Europe, in Heidelberg, West Germany, Deputy Commander of the Eighth Army in Korea, and U.S. Representative to the Central Treaty Organization in Ankara, Turkey. He retired from the Army in 1971.

Later life
Heintges died on 31 March 1994 in Colorado Springs, Colorado. He is buried at West Point Cemetery.

Decorations
His decorations included the Distinguished Service Medal, Silver Star (2), Legion of Merit (2), Soldier's Medal, Bronze Star (3 V Device), Air Medal (12), Army Commendation Medal, Purple Heart, Fourragère and Croix de Guerre (with Palm).

References

German emigrants to the United States
United States Army generals
1912 births
1994 deaths
Military personnel from Koblenz
United States Army personnel of World War II
United States Army personnel of the Vietnam War
United States Military Academy alumni
United States Army War College alumni